Daniel Schildorfer (born 15 January 1982) is an Austrian ice hockey player currently playing for Graz 99ers in the Austrian Hockey League.

Schildorfer spent two seasons in the North American Hockey League with the Pittsburgh Forge before returning to Austria.  He had single season spells with Zeltweg and EC VSV before moving to Graz to 2005.

External links

1982 births
Austrian ice hockey players
Graz 99ers players
Living people
EC VSV players
Place of birth missing (living people)
21st-century Austrian people